In Greek mythology, the Neikea (Ancient Greek: Νείκεα; singular:  Neikos "quarrels") were spirits of arguments, feuds, quarrels and grievances. Their Roman counterpart was Altercatio.

Family

Hesiod's account 
In Hesiod's Theogony identifies the Neikea as children of Eris (Strife) through parthenogenesis and siblings of Hysminai ("Battles"), Makhai ("Wars"), Phonoi ("Murders") and Androktasiai (Manslaughters").

 "And hateful Eris bore painful Ponos ("Hardship"),
 Lethe ("Forgetfulness") and Limos ("Starvation") and the tearful Algea ("Pains"),
 Hysminai ("Battles"), Makhai ("Wars"), Phonoi ("Murders"), and Androktasiai ("Manslaughters");
 Neikea ("Quarrels"), Pseudea ("Lies"), Logoi ("Stories"), Amphillogiai ("Disputes")
 Dysnomia ("Anarchy") and Ate ("Ruin"), near one another,
 and Horkos ("Oath"), who most afflicts men on earth,
 Then willing swears a false oath."

Hyginus'  account 
In another account, Neikos/ Altercatio was the offspring of the primordial deities Aether and Gaia.

 "From Aether (Air) and Terra/ Gaia (Earth) [were born]: Dolor/ Algos (Pain), Dolus (Guile), Ira/ Lyssa (Anger), Luctus/ Penthus (Lamentation), Mendacium/ Pseudologoi (Lies), Jusjurandum/ Horcus (Oath), Ultio/ Poine (Vengeance), Intemperantia (Intemperance), Altercatio/ Neikea (Altercation), Oblivio/ Lethe (Forgetfulness), Socordia/ Aergia (Sloth), Timor/ Phobos (Fear), Superbia (Arrogance), Incestum (Sacrilege), Pugna/ Hysminai (Combat)."

Notes

Greek gods
Personifications in Greek mythology

References 

 Gaius Julius Hyginus, Fabulae from The Myths of Hyginus translated and edited by Mary Grant. University of Kansas Publications in Humanistic Studies. Online version at the Topos Text Project.
 Hesiod, Theogony from The Homeric Hymns and Homerica with an English Translation by Hugh G. Evelyn-White, Cambridge, MA.,Harvard University Press; London, William Heinemann Ltd. 1914. Online version at the Perseus Digital Library. Greek text available from the same website.

Children of Eris (mythology)